Valmiki is 1963 Indian Telugu-language Hindu mythological film, based on the life of Valmiki, produced by S. K. Habibulla under Jupiter Pictures and directed by C. S. Rao. The films stars N. T. Rama Rao and Rajasulochana, with music composed by Ghantasala. Director Rao and Jupiter Pictures made the film simultaneously in Kannada with the same title starring Rajkumar in the lead role retaining most of the cast and crew.

Plot 
Raksha belongs to a tribal family of thieves. He attacks a Princess named Kalyani and robs her. But Kalyani falls in love with Raksha at first sight and she finds him to be the man of her dreams. At her request, he accompanies her to the palace. The king thanks him for bringing the princess to the palace safely. But, soon, a soldier reveals to the King that Raksha is a robber. The King asks him to change his ways, to which Raksha replies bluntly. After a heated conversation, the king orders to capture him and Raksha fights the soldiers and escapes. While near a river, he is attacked by an arrow of a soldier and Raksha falls into the river from the top of a cliff. Tara rescues him and falls in love with him at first sight. Tara is the daughter of the neighboring village chief. After Raksha gets cured of his injury, he loves Tara too. Kalyani keeps nagging at Raksha to marry her and gets very adamant. So, Raksha and Tara trick Kalyani into thinking that she is a murderer. One day, Tara wishes for Nagaratna Maala (necklace of precious stones of the snake god). His father-in-law tells him that the precious stones might be there in the head of the snakes. Raksha orders his men to cut the heads of all the snakes until they find the stone. They cut many snakes but they do not find anything. Then he learns that the necklace is on the neck of the idol Goddess Mahalakshmi in Ayodhya. He desecrates the Lakshmi temple to steal the jewelry, but the necklace vanishes. On his way, Raksha meets the divine sage Narada, who asked him if his family would share the sin he was incurring. Rakha replies positively, but Narada tells him to confirm this with his family. Raksha asks his family, but none agree to bear the burden of sin. Dejected, the robber finally understood the truth of life and asked for Narada's forgiveness. Narada taught the robber the mantra for salvation. But, the mantra in question, the name of Lord Rama, was not to be given to murderers and the like. Narada thus told Valmiki to chant "Mara" the phonetic anagram of "Rama" instead to circumvent this restriction. The robber meditated for many years, so much so that ant-hills grew around him. Finally, a divine voice declares his penance successful, bestowing him with the name "Valmiki": "one born out of ant-hills" (Valmikam in Sanskrit means ant-hill). He then composes the epic Ramayana.

Cast 
N. T. Rama Rao as Raksha / Valmiki
Kalyanam Raghuramaiah as Narada Maharshi
Rajasulochana as Taara
Kantha Rao as Lord Vishnu
Rajanala as Dundubhi
Padmanabham as Bhethala
Mikkilineni as King
Dr. Sivaramakrishnaiah
Leelavathi as Princess Kalyani
Sarada as Goddess Lakshmi
Meena Kumari as Patala

Soundtrack 
Music composed by Ghantasala. The lyrics were written by Samudrala Sr.

References

External links 
 

1960s Telugu-language films
Indian multilingual films
Hindu mythological films
Films directed by C. S. Rao
Films scored by Ghantasala (musician)